Kothapalle or Kothapalli or Kothapally may refer to:

Places

Andhra Pradesh, India 

U.Kothapalli
Kothapalle, Kurnool district
T Kothapalle, a village in East Godavari district
Kothapalle, Guntur district
E. Kothapalli, a village in Pulivendual mandal, Kadapa district
G.Kothapalli, a village in Prakasam district
N. Kothapalli, a village in Nellore district
Kothapally waterfalls, waterfalls in Visakhapatnam district

Telangana, India 
Kothapally, Karimnagar district
Kothapally, Nizamabad district
Kothapally, Ranga Reddy district
Kothapalli (Haveli), a village northwest of Karimnagar City

People 
Kothapalli Geetha, Indian politician and member of parliament from Araku Lok Sabha constituency, Andhra Pradesh
Kothapalli Jayashankar, Indian academic and social activist from Telangana